The monument to the victims of the raid in Novi Sad was erected in 1971 in Novi Sad, Serbia, and represents a famous place as an immovable cultural asset of great importance.

History  

In Novi Sad, on the quay that today bears the name Quay of the Raid Victims, the fascist occupier executed a mass shooting of more than a thousand innocent citizens of Novi Sad in the so-called "January Raid" from January 21 to 23, 1942. The bronze composition "The Family", 4 m high, dedicated to the victims of the Second World War was erected at that place.

Appearance of the monument 

The monument is the work of sculptor Jovan Soldatović and was discovered in 1971. At the beginning of 1992, the monument was completed with another 78 bronze plates made by the same sculptor. Four plaques (three with text in Serbian and one in Hebrew) contain basic information about the event, and 66 plaques contain the names of the murdered persons. Between the plates with the texts are rhythmically arranged plates decorated with the symbols of the Star of David (4 plates), the cross (2) and the eye (1). Below the monument are plaques with texts in Serbian, Hungarian, Slovak and Hebrew.

The reconstruction of the forcibly removed plates was carried out in 2004.

Gallery

References

World War II monuments and memorials in Serbia
Novi Sad